Max Bastian (28 August 1883 – 11 March 1958) was a German Admiral (Admiral (Germany)) in the Kriegsmarine during World War II who served as President of the Reich Military Court until his retirement in 1944.

Bastian was a decorated Naval Officer during World War I. In 1939, he was made president of the Reich Military Court. While serving in this position, Bastian oversaw the death penalties of multiple conscientious objectors within the Wehrmacht. He was briefly represented by Paul von Hase while ill in 1943. The aging Bastian retired in 1944.

See also
Flag officers of the Kriegsmarine

Bibliography

References 

1883 births
1958 deaths
Military personnel from Brandenburg
Kriegsmarine admirals
Imperial German Navy personnel of World War I